"Dusty Pages" is a song by Australian rock, synthpop band, Icehouse. It was third single from their third album, Sidewalk. It was released on 26 November 1984, and peaked at No. 82 on the Australian Kent Music Report singles chart.

Charts

References

1984 singles
Icehouse (band) songs
Songs written by Iva Davies
1984 songs